Armells Creek is a stream in Rosebud County, in the U.S. state of Montana.  It is a tributary of the Yellowstone River.

See also
List of rivers of Montana

References

Rivers of Rosebud County, Montana
Rivers of Montana